The Port of Payra is a seaport located at Kalapara in Patuakhali, Bangladesh. It was established by an Act of Parliament in 2013. The port was officially inaugurated in 2016. It is located on the Ramnabad Channel near the Bay of Bengal. The port is undergoing expansion and the project is expected to be completed in 2021.

Background
Payra port was originally planned as China's bid for another deep seaport in its String of Pearls strategy. The construction of the port, which was being financed on a public-private partnership (PPP) platform, was therefore granted to a Chinese company. India, Japan, and the United States opposed the plan.

In 2016, Indian companies stepped in to invest in the port. An MoU was signed with Jan De Nul Group in 2016 to dredge the Ramnabad canal.  

As of 2017, Payra was primarily a governmental route for import and export.

The Payra Port Authority is an autonomous agency which is responsible for the management of the seaport of Payra.

As of 2021, plans to for a deep seaport at Payra have been shelved and the port was to be developed as a regular seaport.

References

External links
 
 
 
 
 
 
 
 
 
 
 
 
 
 
 
 
 
 
 
 Port of Payra Authority Act, 2013

Patuakhali District
Payra